Poland competed at the 1992 Summer Paralympics in Barcelona, Spain. 40 competitors from Poland won 32 medals including 10 gold, 12 silver and 10 bronze and finished 14th in the medal table.

See also 
 Poland at the Paralympics
 Poland at the 1992 Summer Olympics

References 

Nations at the 1992 Summer Paralympics
1992
Summer Paralympics